Stone Arch Road Bridge, Stewartstown Railroad is a historic railroad bridge in Shrewsbury Township, York County, Pennsylvania.  It was built about 1895, and measures  overall. The girder bridge on stone abutments was built by the Stewartstown Railroad.

It was added to the National Register of Historic Places in 1995.

References

Railroad bridges on the National Register of Historic Places in Pennsylvania
Bridges completed in 1895
Bridges in York County, Pennsylvania
National Register of Historic Places in York County, Pennsylvania
Girder bridges in the United States
Stone arch bridges in the United States